Slyusarevo is a rural locality (a selo) in Miroshnikovskoye Rural Settlement, Kotovsky District, Volgograd Oblast, Russia. The population was 461 as of 2010. There are 5 streets.

Geography 
Slyusarevo is located in steppe, on Volga Upland, on the right bank of the Solodovka River, 21 km north of Kotovo (the district's administrative centre) by road. Doroshevo is the nearest rural locality.

References 

Rural localities in Kotovsky District